David Fiel Rodriguez (born 28 August 1993) is a Cuban volleyball player, former member of the Cuban national volleyball team. At the professional club level, he plays for the French team, Paris Volley.

Sporting achievements

Clubs
 National championships
 2016/2017  Qatari Championship, with El Jaish
 2018/2019  Polish SuperCup, with PGE Skra Bełchatów
 2020/2021  German Championship, with VfB Friedrichshafen

Individual awards
 2014: Pan American Cup – Best Middle Blocker

References

External links
 
 Player profile at PlusLiga.pl 
 Player profile at Volleybox.net
 2011 FIVB U19 World Championship – Team Cuba

1993 births
Living people
People from Havana
Cuban men's volleyball players
Expatriate volleyball players in Qatar
Cuban expatriate sportspeople in Poland
Expatriate volleyball players in Poland
Cuban expatriate sportspeople in France
Expatriate volleyball players in France
Cuban expatriate sportspeople in Germany
Expatriate volleyball players in Germany
Skra Bełchatów players
Middle blockers